Josep Franch de Pablo (born 28 January 1991) is a Spanish professional basketball player for Girona of the LEB Oro

Awards and accomplishments

Spain national team
FIBA Europe Under-16 Championship: Silver Medal (2007)
FIBA Europe Under-20 Championship: Bronze Medal (2010)
FIBA Europe Under-20 Championship: Gold Medal (2011)

External links
ACB Josep Franch Profile
Draftexpress Profile

1991 births
Living people
Basketball players from Catalonia
Bàsquet Girona players
CB Breogán players
CB Murcia players
Real Betis Baloncesto players
Gipuzkoa Basket players
Joventut Badalona players
Melilla Baloncesto players
Liga ACB players
People from Badalona
Sportspeople from the Province of Barcelona
Point guards
Spanish men's basketball players